Nashgulan (also Romanized as Nashgūlān; also known as Nashkalān) is a village in Baryaji Rural District, in the Central District of Sardasht County, West Azerbaijan Province, Iran. At the 2006 census, its population was 141, in 24 families.

References 

Populated places in Sardasht County